Fisher's Brook is a hamlet in Calne Without parish, Wiltshire, England, with a population of approximately 25. It consists of a small number of houses just south of the bridge over Fisher's Brook on the minor road from Calne to Whitley and Bremhill.

The brook flows into the Cowage Brook (a tributary of the River Marden) further west at Ratford.

References 

Calne Without
Hamlets in Wiltshire